The following is a list of  indoor arenas in China, with a capacity of at least 4,000 spectators. 
Most of the arenas in this list have multiple uses such as individual sports, team sports as well as cultural events and political events.

Currently in Use

Under construction

Under Proposition

See also
List of indoor arenas
List of football stadiums in China

References

Indoor arenas in China
Indoor arenas
China
Indoor arenas